The men's 5000 metres walk event  at the 1985 IAAF World Indoor Games was held at the Palais Omnisports Paris-Bercy on 19 January.

Results

References

5000
Racewalking at the IAAF World Indoor Championships